Trevor Charles Banks (born 4 October 1955) is a former motorcycle racer from England, who competed in grasstrack and longtrack. He is the son of Monty Banks who was a notable Grasstrack competitor in the South East of England.

World Longtrack Championship

 1981 - Semi-final
 1982 - Semi-final
 1983 - Semi-final
 1984 - Semi-final
 1985 - Qualifying Round
 1986 -  Pfarrkirchen (17th) 3pts
 1987 -  Mühldorf (13th) 5pts
 1988 - Qualifying Round
 1989 - Qualifying Round

European Grasstrack Championship

Finals
 1978  Hereford (5th) 19pts
 1980  Bad Waldsee (4th) 18pts
 1990  Uithuizen (6th) 13pts
 1991  Werlte (Third) 17pts
 1992  Alken (7th) 13pts
 1998  Schwarme (5th) 15pts
 2000  St. Colomb de Lauzun (10th) 9pts
 2002  Berghaupten (13th) 6pts
 2003  La Reole (17) 5pts

Semi-final
 1979  Damme (9th) 9pts
 1995  Bielefeld (12th) 6pts

British Grasstrack Championship

Masters Finals
 1982  Exeter (Top Ten)
 1983  Evesham (Top Ten)
 1984  Yarm (Second)
 1985  Abingdon (Third)
 1986  Exeter (Third)
 1987  Andover (Second)
 1988  Abingdon (Second)
 1989  Andover (Top Ten)
 1990  Chetton Finalist
 1991  Tonbridge (Top Ten)
 1992  Abingdon (Top Ten)
 1993  Wimborne (Second)
 1994  Tonbridge (Top Ten)
 1995  Monkhopton Finalist
 1996  Dalton Barracks Finalist
 1997  Andover (Third)
 1999  Dalton Barracks (Top Ten)
 2000  Folkestone (Top Ten)
 2001  Dalton Barracks (Top Ten)
 2002  Thorpe St Peter Finalist
 2003  Folkestone Finalist

500cc Finals
 1979  Braintree (Champion)
 1980  Clyst St. Mary (Champion)
 1981  Uckington (Second)

350cc Finals
 1973  Bocking (Third)
 1975  Spilsby (Second)

References

 Grasstrack Video
 Sittingbourne Speedway
 French
 Speedway Archive

1955 births
Living people
British speedway riders
English motorcycle racers
Hackney Hawks riders
Crayford Kestrels riders
Wimbledon Dons riders
Sheffield Tigers riders
Wolverhampton Wolves riders
People from Folkestone
Individual Speedway Long Track World Championship riders